Senpukuji Cave is a significant paleolithic site located in Sasebo, Japan from the early incipient Jōmon period. The site was anciently used seasonally to make microlithic tools. 2,153 tools have been found in one layer. Pottery has been found that was created using a linear applique technique. The antiquity of these ceramics dates to the final pleistocene. It has been dated by Carbon-14 to be about 12000 years old.

See also
 Fukui cave

References

Nagasaki Prefecture
 Nagasaki